Miguel Blesa de la Parra (8 August 1947 – 19 July 2017) was a Spanish banker, the chairman of the Spanish bank Caja Madrid from 1996 to 2009.

In February 2017, Blesa was sentenced to a six-year jail term in connection with the widespread misuse of company credit cards during his long tenure as chairman of Caja Madrid, but remained at liberty pending the outcome of an appeal to the Supreme Court.

Blesa was found dead on a private hunting estate in the province of Córdoba on 19 July 2017, with a shotgun wound to the chest. The autopsy on 20 July confirmed that he killed himself.
As the death of Rita Barberá and the others from Gürtel (Francisco Yáñez, María del Mar Rodríguez  and Isidro Cuberos) Blesa's heirs are liable for damages to the harmed.

He received a Golden Medal from the Real Academia de la Historia, and was awarded as Mejor Presidente de Entidad Financiera 2005 by Banca 15.

References

1947 births
2017 suicides
Spanish bankers
People named in the Panama Papers
Suicides by firearm in Spain
Spanish fraudsters
University of Granada alumni
People from Linares, Jaén